Mustafa Suleyman  (born August 1984) is the co-founder and former head of applied AI at DeepMind, an artificial intelligence company acquired by Google and now owned by Alphabet. His current venture is Inflection AI.

Early life 
Suleyman's father is a Syrian-born taxi driver and his mother is an English nurse.

He grew up off Caledonian Road in the London Borough of Islington, where he lived with his parents and his two younger brothers.

Suleyman went to Thornhill Primary School (a state school in Islington) followed by Queen Elizabeth's School, a boys' grammar school in Barnet. Around that time, he met his DeepMind co-founder, Demis Hassabis, through his best friend, Demis's younger brother. Suleyman said that he and Hassabis would discuss how they could impact the world.

Career
At 19, Suleyman dropped out of Mansfield College, Oxford to help start the Muslim Youth Helpline with his university friend Mohammed Mamdani, a telephone counselling service. The organization became one of the largest mental health support services of its kind in the UK.

Suleyman subsequently worked as a policy officer on human rights for Ken Livingstone, the Mayor of London, before going on to start Reos Partners, a ‘systemic change’ consultancy that uses methods from conflict resolution to navigate social problems. As a negotiator and facilitator, Mustafa worked for a wide range of clients such as the United Nations, the Dutch government, and the World Wide Fund for Nature.

Suleyman co-founded DeepMind Technologies, a leading artificial intelligence (AI) company and became its chief product officer. DeepMind was bought by Google in 2014 and he became head of applied AI at DeepMind.

In August 2019, Bloomberg reported that Suleyman had been placed on administrative leave following controversy about him. In 2021, the Wall Street Journal revealed that he had been placed on leave in 2019 following an investigation into employees' allegations of bullying as their manager. The company hired an external lawyer to investigate the allegations before placing him on leave at the time, and shortly thereafter Suleyman left to take a VP role at parent company Google. An email circulated by DeepMind's leadership to staff after the story broke, as well as additional details published by Business Insider, said Suleyman's "management style fell short" of expected standards.

DeepMind 
Suleyman is one of the three co-founders of the artificial intelligence / machine learning company DeepMind Technologies, and started out as its chief product officer. The company quickly established itself as one of the leaders in the AI sector and was backed by Founders Fund, Elon Musk and Scott Banister amongst others.

In 2014 DeepMind was acquired by Google for a reported £400 million — the company's largest acquisition in Europe at that time. Following the acquisition, Suleyman became head of applied AI at DeepMind, taking on responsibility for integrating the company's technology across a wide range of Google products.

In February 2016 Suleyman launched DeepMind Health at the Royal Society of Medicine. DeepMind Health builds clinician-led technology for the NHS and other partners to improve frontline healthcare services. Under Suleyman, DeepMind also developed research collaborations with healthcare organizations in the United Kingdom, including Moorfields Eye Hospital NHS Foundation Trust, 

In 2016, Suleyman led an effort to apply DeepMind's machine learning algorithms to help reduce the energy required to cool Google's data centres. The system evaluated the billions of possible combinations of actions that the data centre operators could take, and came up with recommendations based on the predicted power usage. The system discovered novel methods of cooling, leading to a reduction of up to 40% of the amount of energy used for cooling, and a 15% improvement in the buildings' overall energy efficiency.

Post-DeepMind 

In December 2019, Suleyman announced he would be leaving DeepMind to join Google, working in a policy role.

Suleyman left Google in January 2022 and joined Greylock Partners as a venture partner.

In March 2022, Suleyman co-founded a new AI lab venture with Reid Hoffman, known as Inflection AI which raised $225 million. The company was founded with the goal of leveraging "AI to help humans 'talk' to computers," and recruited former staff from companies such as Google and Meta.

AI ethics 
Suleyman is prominent in the debate over the ethics of AI and has spoken widely about the need for companies, governments and civil society to join in holding technologists accountable for the impacts of their work. He has advocated redesigning incentives in the technology industry to steer business leaders toward prioritising social responsibility alongside their fiduciary duties. Within DeepMind he set up a research unit called DeepMind Ethics & Society to study the real-world impacts of AI and help technologists put ethics into practice.

Suleyman is also a founding co-chair of the Partnership on AI – an organisation that includes representatives from companies such as Amazon, Apple, DeepMind, Facebook, Google, IBM, and Microsoft. The organisation studies and formulates best practices for AI technologies, advances the public's understanding of AI, and serves as an open platform for discussion and engagement about AI and how it affects people and society. Its board of directors has equal representation from non-profit and for profit entities.

References

Living people
British businesspeople
Google employees
British people of Syrian descent
1984 births
Commanders of the Order of the British Empire
Artificial intelligence ethicists